The Water Hole is a 1928 American silent Western film directed by F. Richard Jones starring Jack Holt, Nancy Carroll, and John Boles It was based on a novel by Zane Grey and released by Paramount Pictures. The film had sequences filmed in Technicolor, and it was shot during July in Death Valley, California. No copies of The Water Hole are known to exist, suggesting that it is a lost film.

Cast
 Jack Holt as Philip Randolph
 Nancy Carroll as Judith Endicott
 John Boles as Bert Durland
 C. Montague Shaw as Mr. Endicott
 Ann Christy as Dolores
 Lydia Yeamans Titus as 'Ma' Bennett
 Jack Perrin as Ray
 Jack Mower as Mojave
 Paul Ralli as Diego
 Tex Young as Shorty
 Robert Miles as Joe (credited as Bob Miles)
 Greg Whitespear as Indian

References

External links

 
 

1928 films
1928 Western (genre) films
1920s color films
1928 lost films
Films based on works by Zane Grey
Films based on American novels
Films directed by F. Richard Jones
Films shot in California
Paramount Pictures films
Silent films in color
Films with screenplays by Herman J. Mankiewicz
Silent American Western (genre) films
1920s American films